Robert Grant Mutch (born 3 September 1984) is a South African cricketer who has played for Easterns cricket team and Somerset County Cricket Club.  He is a left-handed batsman and left arm medium-fast bowler. He made his first-class debut for Easterns cricket team against Griqualand West, on 19 January 2006 and took four wickets in the first innings.

References

External links
 
 

1984 births
Living people
Cricketers from Johannesburg
South African cricketers
Easterns cricketers
Somerset cricketers